Austa is an unincorporated community in Lane County, Oregon, United States, on Oregon Route 126, approximately  west of Walton. Wildcat Creek empties into the Siuslaw River at this site, and the Lane County Park Service maintains a boat ramp.  Austa was named after Austa Grace Yingling where she met her husband William John Vaughn, who drove a stage coach along the river.

See also
 Wildcat Creek Bridge
 Linslaw, Oregon

References 

Unincorporated communities in Lane County, Oregon
Unincorporated communities in Oregon